In enzymology, a L-methionine (R)-S-oxide reductase is an enzyme that catalyzes the chemical reaction

L-methionine + thioredoxin disulfide + H2O  L-methionine (R)-S-oxide + thioredoxin

The 3 substrates of this enzyme are L-methionine, thioredoxin disulfide, and H2O, whereas its two products are L-methionine (R)-S-oxide and thioredoxin.

This enzyme belongs to the family of oxidoreductases, specifically those acting on a sulfur group of donors with a disulfide as acceptor.  The systematic name of this enzyme class is L-methionine:thioredoxin-disulfide S-oxidoreductase [L-methionine (R)-S-oxide-forming]. Other names in common use include fRMsr, FRMsr, free met-R-(o) reductase, and free-methionine (R)-S-oxide reductase.  This enzyme participates in methionine metabolism.

References

 

EC 1.8.4
Enzymes of unknown structure